Op zoek naar Mary Poppins (Looking for Mary Poppins) was a 2009 talent show-themed television series produced by the AVRO in the Netherlands and broadcast on AVRO.
It premiered in late August 2009. The show searched for a new, unknown lead to play Mary Poppins in a Dutch production of the Dutch musical Mary Poppins.

It was the third Dutch talent show to be produced by the AVRO/Willem Nijholt, after Op zoek naar Evita which aired in 2007 and Op zoek naar Joseph which aired in 2008. Op zoek naar Zorro aired in late 2010, Op zoek naar Annie aired in 2012, Op zoek naar Maria aired in 2021 and Op zoek naar Danny & Sandy aired in late 2022.

The show was hosted by Frits Sissing with Willem Nijholt again overseeing the programme.

In the final, on 24 January, Noortje Herlaar was announced as the winner of the series.

Format

Expert panel
To assess and train the potential Marys and judge them during the live shows, an expert panel was chosen. The panel included:
 Willem Nijholt – actor and singer.
 Thom Hoffman – actor and photographer
 Erwin van Lambaart – managing director of Joop van den Ende theatre
 Pia Douwes – musical theatre actress who is very successful in Europe

Weekly format
The show opens with a group number by the Marys. Each Mary then performs a song, with feedback provided by the panel and Nijholt. The public votes for the contestant they wish to keep in the show. After the results of the public vote have been processed, the two Marys with the fewest votes enter a "sing-off". Nijholt then chooses which Mary from the "sing-off" to save each week. The eliminated Mary has her umbrella and coat stripped off by the surviving Mary and then takes the lead in their sing-out medley of "Een klein schepje suiker (A Spoonful of Sugar)" and "Alles kan (Anything Can Happen)".

Finalists
Eleven potential Marys made it through the audition rounds and performed during the live shows.

* at the start of the contest

Results summary

Live shows

Week one (6 December)
Eefje was the first Mary to be eliminated in the Results show on Sunday followed by Suzanne who was the second Mary to be eliminated.

The show performances were:

Group performances:
Opening number: "Hier ben ik dan (I Just Arrived)" with Freek Bartels from the musical Copacabana
Group number 1: "Supercalifragilisticexpialidocious"
Group number 2: "Zing, vecht, huil, bid, lach, werk en bewonder" & "We zullen doorgaan" as a tribute to the late Ramses Shaffy
Individual performances (in order of performance):
Noortje & Carmen: "No More Tears (Enough Is Enough)" by Donna Summer & Barbra Streisand
Bente & Simone: "Ik ken hem te goed (I Know Him So Well)" from the musical Chess
Eefje, Sophie & Suzanne: "Ik ben een vrouw (I Am a Woman)" from the musical 3 Musketiers
Angenita & Willemijn: "Pak maar m‘n hand" by Nick & Simon
Irene & Rosalie: "Tell Him" by Céline Dion & Barbra Streisand
Jury's favourite Mary Poppins:
Erwin van Lambaart: Sophie
Pia Douwes: Irene
Thom Hoffman: Noortje
Sing-off:
In the first show, Eefje and Carmen were in the sing-off. They sang "Zonder jou" (by Simone Kleinsma & Paul de Leeuw).
Willem Nijholt chose to save Carmen and vote Eefje off.
In the second show, the bottom two were Irene and Suzanne. In the sing-off, they sang "Laat me niet alleen (Ne me quitte pas)" (by Jacques Brel).
Irene was saved by Nijholt and Suzanne was voted off.

Week two (13 December)
Bente was the third Mary to be eliminated in the Results show on Sunday

The show performances were:
Group performances:
Opening number: "We're All in This Together" from the film High School Musical
Group number 1: "Supercalifragilisticexpialidocious"
Group number 2: "Starmaker" from the film Fame
Individual performances (in order of performance):
Willemijn: "Ik voel me heerlijk (I Feel Pretty)" from the musical West Side Story
Carmen: "My All" by Mariah Carey
Sophie: "The Boy Does Nothing" by Alesha Dixon
Irene: "Denk aan mij (Think of Me)" from the musical The Phantom of the Opera
Rosalie: "Nu dat jij er bent" by Trijntje Oosterhuis
Angenita: "Dingen waar ik zo van hou (My Favorite Things)" from the musical The Sound of Music
Simone: "Geef me liefde (Love Me Tender)" from the musical All Shook Up
Bente: "Hot n Cold" by Katy Perry
Noortje: "Tot jij mijn liefde voelt (To Make You Feel My Love)" by Van Dik Hout
Jury's favourite Mary Poppins:
Erwin van Lambaart: Simone
Pia Douwes: Simone
Thom Hoffman: Noortje
Sing-off:
Bente and Angenita were in the sing-off. They sang "Er is een plaats voor ons (Somewhere)" (from the musical West Side Story).
Willem Nijholt chose to save Angenita and vote Bente off.

Week three (20 December)
Angenita was the fourth Mary to be eliminated in the Results show on Sunday.

The show performances were:
Group performances:
Opening number: "Sleigh Ride" by The Ronettes
Group number 1: "Supercalifragilisticexpialidocious"
Group number 2: "I Will Follow Him" from the film Sister Act
Individual performances (in order of performance):
Irene: "Why Couldn't It Be Christmas Every Day?" by Bianca Ryan
Sophie: "Wat is mijn hart" by Marco Borsato
Angenita: "Santa Claus is Coming to Town" by Mariah Carey
Noortje: "Kom Terug En Dans Met Mij (I Could Have Danced All Night)" from the musical My Fair Lady
Willemijn: "Winter Wonderland" by Amy Grant
Rosalie: "Cheek to Cheek" by Jane Monheit
Carmen: "Dat zegt het hart (A Change in Me)" from the musical Beauty and the Beast
Simone: "All I Want for Christmas Is You" by Mariah Carey
Jury's favourite Mary Poppins:
Erwin van Lambaart: Simone
Pia Douwes: Rosalie
Thom Hoffman: Sophie
Sing-off:
Irene and Angenita were in the sing-off. They sang "Nog een kans" (by Vera Mann).
Willem Nijholt chose to save Irene and vote Angenita off.

Week four (27 December)
Simone was the fifth Mary to be eliminated in the Results show on Sunday

The show performances were:
Group performances:
Opening number: "Come Fly with Me" by Frank Sinatra
Group number 1: "SupercalifragilisticexpialidociousGroup number 2: "Love Me Just a Little Bit More" by Dolly Dots
Individual performances (in order of performance):
Simone: "Ik leef niet meer voor jou" by Marco Borsato
Irene: "I Still Haven't Found What I'm Looking For" by U2
Noortje: "I'm the Greatest Star" from the musical Funny GirlRosalie: "Appels op de tafelsprei" by Toon Hermans & Mathilde Santing
Willemijn: "Hij kan niet zonder mij (As Long as He Needs Me)" from the musical Oliver!Sophie: "Fields of Gold" by Eva Cassidy
Carmen: "Diamonds Are a Girl's Best Friend" from the film Moulin RougeJury's favourite Mary Poppins:
Erwin van Lambaart: Rosalie
Pia Douwes: Noortje
Thom Hoffman: Irene
Sing-off:
Willemijn and Simone were in the sing-off. They sang "Telkens weer" (by Willeke Alberti).
Willem Nijholt chose to save Willemijn and vote Simone off.

Week five (3 January)
Carmen was the sixth Mary to be eliminated in the Results show on Sunday.

The show performances were:
Group performances:
Opening number: "Crazy in Love" by Beyoncé Knowles
Group number 1: "A Spoonful of Sugar" featuring the children, who will play as Jane and Michael Banks in the upcoming Dutch production of Mary Poppins
Group number 2: "Supercalifragilisticexpialidocious"
Group number 3: "December, 1963 (Oh, What a Night)" from the musical Jersey BoysIndividual performances (in order of performance):
Sophie: "Als ze mij zo zouwen zien" ("If My Friends Could See Me Now") from the musical Sweet CharityNoortje: "Almaz" (Dutch version) by Karin Bloemen
Rosalie: "Het gaat beginnen" ("Something's Coming") from the musical West Side StoryWillemijn: "Don't Rain on My Parade" from the musical Funny GirlCarmen: "Wacht nog wat" by Paul de Leeuw
Irene: "Meidengrut" ("Little Girls") from the musical AnnieJury's favourite Mary Poppins:
Erwin van Lambaart: Noortje
Pia Douwes: Irene (but revealed that her other favourite was Noortje, but was positive about Irene)
Thom Hoffman: Sophie
Sing-off:
Carmen and Willemijn were in the sing-off. They sang "Laat het op een zondag zijn (Tell Me on a Sunday)" (from the musical of the same name).
Willem Nijholt chose to save Willemijn and vote Carmen off.

Week six (10 January)
Week six was the quarter-final stage of the series.

Willemijn was the seventh Mary to be eliminated in the Results show on Sunday.

The show performances were:
Group performances:
Opening number: "Fame" from the film FameGroup number 1: "Supercalifragilisticexpialidocious"
Group number 2: "I Say A Little Prayer" by Aretha Franklin
Individual performances (in order of performance):
Round 1:
Willemijn: "Lief zijn voor mamma (When You're Good to Mama)" from the musical ChicagoRosalie: "Zeur niet" from the musical Heerlijk duurt het langstIrene: "Vincent (Dutch version)" by Don McLean
Sophie: "De nachten in Parijs" from the musical Irma la DouceNoortje: "Zin in een feessie" from the musical De StuntRound 2:
Willemijn: "I Will Survive" from the musical Priscilla Queen of the Desert – the MusicalRosalie: "Mijn pakkie an (My Strongest Suit)" from the musical AidaIrene: "Hopeloos verlang ik naar jou (Hopelessy Devoted to You)" from the musical GreaseSophie: "Get Happy" by Judy Garland
Noortje: "Smile" by Charlie Chaplin
Jury's favourite Mary Poppins:
Erwin van Lambaart: Noortje
Pia Douwes: Rosalie
Thom Hoffman: Noortje
Sing-off:
Willemijn and Irene were in the sing-off. They sang "Vluchten kan niet meer" (from the musical En nu naar bed).
Willem Nijholt chose to save Irene and vote Willemijn off.

Week seven (17 January)
Week seven was the semi-final stage of the series.

Irene was the eighth Mary to be eliminated in the Results show on Sunday – the last time Nijholt has any say in the vote.

The show performances were:
Group performances:
Opening number: "Could It Be Magic" by Barry Manilow
Group number 1: "Supercalifragilisticexpialidocious"
Group number 2: "Chim Chim Cher-ee (Rooftop Duet)" featuring William Spaaij, who will play as Bert in the upcoming Dutch production of Mary Poppins
Individual performances (in order of performance):
Round 1:
Irene: "Heel alleen (On My Own)" from the musical Les MisérablesNoortje: "I Have Nothing" by Whitney Houston
Sophie: "Out Here on My Own" from the film FameRosalie: "Doe iets (Show Me)" from the musical My Fair LadyRound 2:
Irene: "Stuff Like That There" from the film For the BoysNoortje: "Jaloezie" by Adèle Bloemendaal
Sophie: "Mens durf te leven" by Wende Snijders
Rosalie: "A Song for You" by Donny Hathaway
Jury's favourite Mary Poppins:
Erwin van Lambaart: Noortje
Pia Douwes: Sophie
Thom Hoffman: Irene
Sing-off:
Irene and Rosalie were in the sing-off. They sang "Misschien dit keer (Maybe This Time)" (from the musical Cabaret).
Willem Nijholt chose to save Rosalie and vote Irene off.

Week-eight (24 January)
Week eight was the final week of the show and the Grand-final when the winning Mary was revealed. Both shows aired live on Sunday with the main show and the Results show. The finalists were Noortje Herlaar, Rosalie de Jong and Sophie Veldhuizen. Noortje was the winner.

With all the decisions now being from the public vote, the voting lines opened at the start of Show One. At the end of Show One, the finalist with the lowest number of viewers votes, Rosalie was eliminated and therefore finished third. The voting lines then re-opened to vote for the series winner, with all the votes cast for the remaining two Marys carried over. Then in Show Two the final two Marys went head-to-head before the winner was announced as Noortje.

All eleven Mary finalists also performed. In Show two both Noortje and Sophie performed "Alles kan als jij het (Anything Can Happen)".

The show performances were:
Group performances:
Former Marys – "De winnaar krijgt de macht (The Winner Takes It All)" from the musical Mamma Mia!Noortje, Rosalie & Sophie – "Als ik win (Brand New Day)" from the musical The WizNoortje, Rosalie & Sophie – "Sing, Sing, Sing" by Louis Prima
Noortje & Sophie – "Tamelijk Voortreffelijk (Practically Perfect)"
Individual performances (in order of performance):
Show one
Rosalie: "Thuis (Home)" from the musical The WizSophie: "Kon ik nog maar even bij je zijn (Wishing You Were Somehow Here Again)" from the musical The Phantom of the OperaNoortje: "Pap, kun je me horen? (Papa, Can You Hear Me?)" from the film YentlShow two
Sophie: "Alles kan (Anything Can Happen)"
Noortje: "Alles kan (Anything Can Happen)''"
Show One third place
At the end of Show one, Rosalie was announced as finishing third.
Jury's verdict on who is Mary Poppins:
After Rosalie was eliminated from the final, the jury share their thoughts on who is Mary Poppins.
Erwin van Lambaart: Noortje
Pia Douwes: could not make a choice between Noortje and Sophie
Thom Hoffman: Sophie
Willem Nijholt: Noortje
The Final Vote
The final vote was then announced and it was revealed that the winner was Noortje Herlaar.

External links
Official Program Website at avro.nl

Dutch reality television series
Singing talent shows
2000s TV shows in the Netherlands
2009 Dutch television series debuts
2010 Dutch television series endings
NPO 1 original programming